Egypt, as United Arab Republic participated at the 1965 All-Africa Games held in the city of Brazzaville, Congo-Brazzaville.

References 

Nations at the 1965 All-Africa Games
1965
United Arab Republic
1965 in Egyptian sport
1965 in Syrian sport